Yamal may refer to:
Yamal Peninsula, a peninsula in Siberia
Yamalo-Nenets Autonomous Okrug, a federal subject of Russia
Yamal Airlines, an airline based in Salekhard, Russia
Yamal (icebreaker), a nuclear-powered Arktika-class Russian icebreaker
Yamal (satellite constellation), a satellite communication constellation by Gazprom Space Systems
Yamal project, a long-term project open the large natural gas fields in the Yamal Peninsula
Yamal–Europe pipeline
Yamal LNG

See also
Yamalo-Nenets Autonomous Okrug, a district in Tyumen Oblast, Western Siberia, Russia
Yamalsky District, Tyumen Oblast, Western Siberia, Russia